Muhammad Ismail is a Pakistani politician who is member-elect of the Gilgit Baltistan Assembly.

Early life
Muhammad Ismail hails from Saltoro Siachen valley, Gilgit Baltistan. He got his Engineering degree in mechanical engineering from University of Engineering and Technology Lahore in 1992.

Political career
Ismail contested for Northern Area Assembly from NA-LA 24 in 1994 as an independent candidate and joined PPP after winning the election. In 1999 , 2004 , 2009 he won from the same constituency four times consecutively on Pakistan People Party ticket.  In 2013 he lost to PMLN’s candidate by 30 votes , later on he challenged the results in court and won the election by 1 vote. He contested in 2020 Gilgit-Baltistan Assembly election on 15 November 2020 from constituency GBA-24 (Ghanche-III) on the ticket from Pakistan Peoples Party. He won the election by the margin of 573 votes over the runner up Syed Shamsuddin of Pakistan Tehreek-e-Insaf. He garnered 6,239 votes while Shamsuddin received 5,666 votes.

Currently Engineer Ismail also holds the position of provincial General Secretary of Pakistan People party.

References

Living people
Gilgit-Baltistan MLAs 2020–2025
Politicians from Gilgit-Baltistan
Year of birth missing (living people)